Eastern New Mexico University (ENMU or Eastern) is a public university with a main campus in Portales, New Mexico, and two associate degree-granting branches, one at Ruidoso and one at Roswell. ENMU is New Mexico's largest regional comprehensive university and is the most recently founded state university in New Mexico (legislated in 1927, opened in 1934). It is a federally designated Hispanic-serving institution and a member of the Hispanic Association of Colleges and Universities. The ENMU System consists of three campuses. The current Chancellor is Dr. James N Johnston who assumed office in 2022.

History

The New Mexico legislature approved the construction and staffing of a normal school in eastern New Mexico in 1927, and approved appropriation for construction in 1929, but the Stock Market Crash of 1929 and the Great Depression hindered the school's opening, which was delayed until 1934 (construction had begun in 1931).

From 1934 to 1940, the institution, first named Eastern New Mexico Junior College (ENMJC) operated as a community college. In 1940, the third and fourth years of college were first offered, leading to a bachelor's degree, and the institution was renamed Eastern New Mexico College (ENMC). ENMC was accredited by the North Central Association of Colleges and Secondary Schools as a four-year liberal arts college in 1946–47. Graduate work leading to the master's degree in some departments was added in 1949, and on April 5, 1949, the Board of Regents approved the change of the institution's name to Eastern New Mexico University.

ENMU System
ENMU owns KENW (TV) and KENW-FM, a public television and radio station that are housed and operated on the main campus. The president of ENMU-Portales also serves as the chancellor for the ENMU System.

The ENMU Ruidoso Campus, ENMU-Ruidoso, is a two-year college or community college (one of 18 in New Mexico) and an official branch of ENMU (branch status being granted in July 2005). Undergraduate and graduate coursework completed at the ENMU-Ruidoso campus is transferable for credit toward an undergraduate or graduate degree at ENMU-Portales, and, typically other undergraduate/graduate institutions in the United States. In 1991, the Ruidoso location had been established as the ENMU Ruidoso Branch Community College and offered two-year college academic and vocational programs. ENMU-Ruidoso offers Certificates of Completion, Associate of Science, Associate of Arts, and Associate of Applied Science degrees, as well as community education classes, customized training workshops, and adult basic education courses. It operates a One-Stop Career Center which provides free employment services for employers and job seekers in Lincoln County.  The center offers both an academic and vocational curriculum. (Ruidoso is located southwest of Portales, in a mountainous region of south-central New Mexico.)

The ENMU Roswell Campus, ENMU-Roswell, also a two-year branch, offers a wide variety of programs. ENMU-Roswell was established in the fall of 1958. Roswell is one of New Mexico's larger cities, located in the southeast section of the state.

ENMU also offers online degrees. ENMU's online degrees in the fields of business and education are the most affordable in the U.S.

Academic organization
ENMU-Portales consists of four colleges and a graduate school:

College of Business

College of Education and Technology
Department of Educational Studies
Department of Curriculum and Instruction
Department of Agriculture, Food Science and Kinesiology 

College of Fine Arts
Department of Art
Department of Communication
Department of Music
Department of Theatre and Digital Filmmaking

College of Liberal Arts and Sciences
Department of Anthropology and Applied Archaeology
Department of Biology
Department of Health and Human Services (Communicative Disorders, Social Work, Nursing, Emergency Management)
Department of History, Social Sciences and Religion
Department of Languages and Literature
Department of Mathematical Sciences
Department of Physical Sciences (Chemistry, Physics, Aviation Science)
Department of Psychology and Political Science

Graduate School
Anthropology
Biology
Business Administration
Chemistry
Analytical Chemistry
Biochemistry
Organic Chemistry
Physical Chemistry
Communication
Communicative Disorders
Counseling
Education
Alternative Licensure
Elementary Education
Secondary Education
Special Education
Bilingual Education
Career and Technical Education
Early Childhood Education
Education Administration
Educational Technology
Gifted Education Pedagogy
Pedagogy and Learning
Reading/Literacy
School Counseling
Secondary Education
Special Education
Special Education Pedagogy
Physical Education
Sport Administration
Nursing

Other facilities
Among ENMU's other facilities are 5 museums, an art gallery, and a library.

Golden Student Success Center
The Golden Student Success Center (GSSC) construction was completed in 2018 replacing the original Golden Library building. The building now houses the Golden Library, the Runnels Gallery and the offices of Tutoring and Supplemental Instruction and Distance Learning.

Golden Library
The Golden Library features General Collections, Special Collections and Government Information. Special Collections includes the Jack Williamson Science Fiction Library, Southwest Collection (including New Mexico collections), University archives, and local history. The General Collection includes newspapers, serials, juvenile books, and K-12 curriculum materials.

Jack Williamson Science Fiction Library
The Jack Williamson Science Fiction Library is part of the Special Collections and has one of the top science fiction collections in the world with over 30,000 volumes, including science fiction books, science fiction pulp magazines dating back to the early 1900s, manuscripts, correspondence, and photographs.

Runnels Gallery
The Runnels Gallery is an exhibit space open to the public that features art by ENMU students, ENMU faculty, and guest artists. Runnels Gallery has hosted national juried exhibitions for artists working in various mediums including two-dimensional, three-dimensional and photography.

ENMU Museums
Dr. Antonio Gennaro Natural History Museum 
The Dr. Antonio Gennaro Natural History Museum is affiliated with the ENMU Department of Biology. The purpose of the museum is to educate the public about the diversity of life while emphasizing the natural heritage of eastern New Mexico and the greater Southwest, particularly the Llano Estacado. Formerly known as the Eastern New Mexico University Natural History Museum, the museum was renamed and dedicated to Dr. Gennaro in spring 2016.  In addition to the taxidermy and study skins on display, the museum features a live animal exhibit with both native and non-native species. Gennaro came to ENMU in 1966 as an associate professor of biological sciences and went on to become a nationally recognized researcher. He started ENMU's vertebrate collection for the museum. He authored and published two books, Nature's Way and Wildlife Falsehoods.

Blackwater Draw Museum
The original Blackwater Draw Museum opened in 1969 at the midway point between Clovis and Portales to display artifacts uncovered at the Blackwater Locality No. 1 site and illustrate life at the Blackwater Draw site during the Clovis period (over 13,000 years ago) through the recent historic period. In 2017, the museum was moved to the ENMU campus and expanded to more broadly incorporate anthropology and related topics.

Miles Mineral Museum
The Miles Mineral Museum features a comprehensive collection of geological specimens representative of the Pecos River valley area, as well as a sampling of specimens from other regions, including several meteorites. The bulk of the objects contained within the museum were once part of the private collection of amateur geologists and mineral enthusiasts, Fred and Gladys Miles. ENMU purchased the [approximately] 2,500 piece collection of geological, archaeological, and anthropological specimens from the couple in 1967. Many additional specimens have been added to the museum over the years since that time. The entire collection was originally displayed at a single ENMU facility named the Miles Museum, which opened in 1969.  In 1984 the objects in the collection were divided up into two categories, and two separate museums were formed to display them; the Miles Mineral Museum and the Miles Anthropology Museum.  The Miles Mineral Museum is now located in Roosevelt Hall, adjacent to the Dr. Antonio Gennaro Natural History museum, on the ENMU campus.

Mr. Fred Miles and Mrs. Gladys Miles began collecting mineral and fossil specimens along the Pecos River after they moved to Roswell, New Mexico, in 1928. They were prolific collectors for 40 years, scouring the Pecos River valley for specimens. They particularly enjoyed finding native American artifacts and a specific type of quartz crystal formation referred to as Pecos Diamonds. For several decades they displayed the majority of their enormous collection at a Texaco service station in Roswell operated by Mr. Miles, who enjoyed showing it to inquisitive customers.

Miles Anthropology Museum
The Miles Anthropology Museum is home to various anthropological and archeological specimens collected by amateur anthropologists Fred and Gladys Miles, as well as to other collections from digs in the region. The private collection of Mr. and Mrs. Miles was also used as the foundation of the Miles Mineral Museum. Both museums are located in Roosevelt Hall in a space that was once the first dining hall on the campus.

Athletics

ENMU's athletic teams participate in the NCAA Division II Lone Star Conference. The men's and women's teams are nicknamed the Greyhounds. Prior to 2015, the women's teams were nicknamed the Zias. In early 2015, students, faculty and staff voted to discontinue the Zia nickname and the women's teams become Greyhounds alongside the men's teams. ENMU vacated five seasons of wins in several sports starting from the 2008–09 season after the university self-reported over 100 eligibility violations.

Greek life 
ENMU currently features two active associated social fraternities and two active associated social sororities. Historically, the school featured several additional social fraternities. The school also features several honors fraternities

Social sororities 
 Chi Omega (active)
 Zeta Tau Alpha (active)

Social fraternities 
 Kappa Sigma (active)
 Pi Kappa Alpha (?-suspended 1993)
 Phi Kappa Psi (1969-dormant 2006)
 Phi Mu Alpha Sinfonia (active)
 Sigma Alpha Epsilon (1963-dormant 2000s)(Reinstated 2021) 
 Sigma Nu (1966-dormant 2001)
 Sigma Chi (1967-suspended by ENMU in 2017)

Honorary/Academic/Service organizations 
 Alpha Psi Omega (active)
 Alpha Sigma Lambda (active)
 Delta Mu Delta (active, established 1981)
 Kappa Delta Pi (active)
 Kappa Kappa Psi (active, chapter established 1949)
 Pi Alpha (active)
 Psi Chi (active)

Notable alumni

Art 
 Michael Kanteena

Athletics 

 Dana Altman, basketball coach
 Mike Boit, runner
 Don Carthel, football coach
 Jon Dalzell, American-Israeli basketball player
 Benjy Dial, football player
 Gerald Dockery, football player
 Mark Fox, football coach
 Conrad Hamilton, football player
 Derrick Harden, football player
 Larry Harris
 Larry Hays
 Greg Hyder, basketball player
 Pete Jaquess, football player
 Steve Kragthorpe, football player and coach
 Matt Simon, football player and coach
 Mike Sinclair, football player
 Bill Snyder, football coach
 Steve Spray, golfer

Film and television 
 Ronny Cox
 Steven Michael Quezada
 Daryush Shokof

Government 

 Juan Babauta
 Mickey D. Barnett
 Robert C. Brack
 Edward L. Chavez
 Sharon Clahchischilliage
 Anna Crook
 Candy Ezzell
 Ed Foreman
 Miguel Garcia
 Carroll Leavell
 James Madalena
 Katherine D. Ortega
 Stevan Pearce
 Dennis Roch
 Clemente Sanchez
 Louis E. Saavedra

Law 
 John E. Douglas
 Arthur M. Dula

Literature and publishing 
 Michael Blake
 Diana Ossana
 Jack Williamson

Science 
 Clyde Snow

Notable faculty 
 Jeffrion L. Aubry
 Bobby Baldock
 Harold Elliott
 Paul Krutak
 Greg Lyne
 Jack Scott
 Christopher Stasheff

References

External links

ENMU Athletics website

 
Educational institutions established in 1934
Buildings and structures in Roosevelt County, New Mexico
Education in Roosevelt County, New Mexico
Education in Lincoln County, New Mexico
Education in Chaves County, New Mexico
1934 establishments in New Mexico
Portales, New Mexico
Public universities and colleges in New Mexico